Stephen Carl Joseph (born November 25, 1937 in Brooklyn, New York City) was the New York City Health Commissioner from 1986 until 1990 after having worked at the United Nations Children's Fund (UNICEF) as Special Coordinator for Child Health and Survival.  He went on to become dean of the School of Public Health at the University of Minnesota and Assistant Secretary of Defense for Health Affairs.

Joseph attended Fieldston School, graduating with his high school diploma in June 1955. He studied at Tufts College for one year before transferring to Harvard College. Joseph earned a bachelor's degree cum laude from Harvard in 1959, a medical degree cum laude from the Yale School of Medicine in 1963 and a master of public health degree from Johns Hopkins University in 1968. He completed his resident internship in pediatrics at the Boston Children's Medical Center.

As New York City Health Commissioner, Joseph was credited with aggressively fighting the AIDS epidemic there.

Joseph married Elizabeth Ann Preble. He has two daughters.

Publications
Dragon Within the Gates: The Once and Future AIDS Epidemic
Summer of Fifty-Seven: Coming of Age in Wyoming’s Shining Mountains
River of Stone, River of Sand: A Story of Medicine and Adventure

References

External links
Widespread Smoking Restrictions Start in NYC

1937 births
Living people
Ethical Culture Fieldston School alumni
Tufts University alumni
Harvard College alumni
Yale School of Medicine alumni
American pediatricians
Johns Hopkins Bloomberg School of Public Health alumni
UNICEF people
Commissioners of Health of the City of New York
Writers from Brooklyn
University of Minnesota faculty
Clinton administration personnel
United States Assistant Secretaries of Defense